Marie Rose may refer to:

People
 Marie Marguerite Rose (1717–1757), Guinea-born Canadian slave
 Marie Rose Abousefian, Armenian actress and writer
 Marie-Rose Armesto (1960–2007), Spanish-born Belgian journalist
 Marie-Rose Astié de Valsayre (1846–1939), French violinist, feminist, nurse and writer
 Marie Rose Cavelan (1752 - fl. 1795), French-Afro-Grenadian planter and revolutionary
 Marie-Rose Carême, French professional football manager
 Marie-Rose Léodille Delaunay (1827–1906), a Haitian educator
 Marie Rose Durocher (1811–1849), Canadian Roman Catholic nun who founded the Sisters of the Holy Names of Jesus and Mary
 Marie Rose Ferron (1902–1936), often called the Little Rose, Canadian-American Roman Catholic mystic
 Marie-Rose Gaillard (born 1944), former Belgian racing cyclist
 Marie Rose Guiraud (1944–2020), Ivorian dancer and choreographer
 Marie-Rose Morel (1972–2011), Flemish-Belgian politician
 Marie Rose Mureshyankwano (born 1968), Rwandan politician
 Marie-Rose Nizigiyimana (born 1966), Burundian politician
 Marie-Rose Turcot (1887–1977), Canadian writer

Other uses
 Marie Rose (Dead or Alive), a character from the video game Dead or Alive
 Marie Rose sauce, a British condiment

See also

 Marie Roze (1846–1926), French operatic soprano
 
 
 Rose Marie (disambiguation)
 Mary Rose (disambiguation)

Feminine given names
French feminine given names